Starksia occidentalis, the occidental blenny, is a species of labrisomid blenny native to reefs of the western Caribbean Sea where it occurs at depths of around .

References

occidentalis
Taxa named by David Wayne Greenfield
Fish described in 1979